Ganguly (also called Ganguli, Ganguly, Gangulee, Gangoly or Gangopadhyay) is an Indian family name of a Bengali Brahmin caste; it is a variant of Gangele Gangopadhyay(a) Gônggopaddhae.  The historical book 'Jāti-Bhāṣkar' mentions that those who were given grants in the village named Gangul, by Ballāl Sena were called Ganguly (i). Also, called Gangopādhyāy (literally 'the Vedic teachers in the regions around the Ganges') because they selected the profession of teaching (upadhyay).

The ancestors of Gangulys are from a hermit or saint called Savarna Muni, belonging to the family of Bhrigu and thus all Gangulys have the same Savarna Gotra, and Aurva-Bhrigu-Chyavana-Aapnuvata-Jaamadagnya Pancha (Five) pravaras which means they are from the same ancestral root.

The Sabarna Roy Choudhury family of Kolkata are actually Gangopadhyay. The titles Roy and later Choudhury were bestowed on their ancestor Lakshmikanta Gangopadhyay by the Muslim emperors Akbar and Jahangir. Job Charnok had purchased three villages from this family. These three villages became Kolkata during the rule of East India Company.The current actual blood heir of Shridhar Ganguly's are Debaprasad Ganguly, Pradip Ganguly, Girija Shankar Ganguly, Sayan Ganguly and Arnab Ganguly.

List of persons with the surname

Business
 Ashok Sekhar Ganguly, former chairman of Hindustan Lever
 Pablo Ganguli, (born 1983), Indian cultural entrepreneur
.

Academic
Enakshi Ganguly, Indian children's rights activist
Kadambini Ganguly, one of the two Indian women doctors who was first South Asian female physician, trained in western medicine to graduate in South Asia.

Politics
 Bipin Behari Ganguli (1887-unknown), Indian freedom fighter
 Pratul Chandra Ganguli, (1884–1957), Indian freedom fighter and revolutionary

Sport
 Bhaskar Ganguly, Indian footballer
 Sourav Ganguly (born 1972), former Indian cricket captain and current BCCI President
 S K Ganguli, cricket umpire
 Partho Ganguli, International Badminton Player. Current National Selector for the sport of Badminton, India

Chess
 Surya Shekhar Ganguly (born 1983), Indian chess grandmaster

Film and acting
 Ganguly family
 Ashok Kumar Ganguly (1911–2001), Indian actor
 Chhaya Devi (1914-2001), Indian actress of Bengali and Hindi movies
 Jahar Ganguly (1904 – 1969), Indian film actor and theatre personality
 Kaushik Ganguly (born 1968), Indian film director, screenwriter and actor
 Churni Ganguly, Indian actress of Bengali movies and TV serials 
 Dhirendra Nath Ganguly (1893-1978), Bengali actor, director and entrepreneur
 Dimpy Ganguly, Indian model and actress
 Jeet Ganguly, Hindi and Bengali musical director, composer and singer
 Kaushik Ganguly, Indian director, screenwriter and actor (Bengali cinema)
 Kishore Kumar Ganguly (1929-1987), Indian singer and actor
 Mouli Ganguly, Indian television actor
 Pijush Ganguly, Indian television actor (Bengali)
 Preeti Ganguly, Indian actress
 Richa Gangopadhyay (born 1986), Indian actress
 Roopa Ganguly (born 1966), Indian actress
 Rupali Ganguly (born 1978), Indian actress
 Samir Ganguly, Indian film director
 Subhashree Ganguly (born 1989), Indian actress
 Usha Ganguly (born 1945) theatre director

Music
 Sunil Ganguly (died 1999), Indian guitarist

Writers and translators
 Kisari Mohan Ganguli, Indian translator (Mahabharata into English)
 Narayan Gangopadhyay (1918–1970), Bengali writer
 Sunil Gangopadhyay (born 1934), Bengali writer

Notes

Resources
       http://www.ancestry.com/facts/Ganguly-name-meaning.ashx
       http://genealogy.familyeducation.com/surname-origin/ganguly

Brahmin communities
Social groups of West Bengal
Indian surnames
Hindu surnames
Bengali Hindu surnames
Kulin Brahmin surnames